La Brea is an American science fiction drama television series that premiered on NBC on September 28, 2021. The series, produced by Keshet Studios and Universal Television, is created and executive produced by David Appelbaum. The series received mixed reviews from critics. In November 2021, the series was renewed for a second season which premiered on September 27, 2022. In January 2023, the series was renewed for a third season.

Synopsis
In the early 2020s, a massive sinkhole opens in the middle of Los Angeles at the site of the La Brea Tar Pits and Wilshire Boulevard. Hundreds of people, vehicles and buildings (including the distinctive Petersen Automotive Museum) are pulled into its depths. The survivors find themselves trapped in a mysterious and dangerous primeval land where they must band together to survive. The show follows Eve Harris, Gavin Harris, Izzy Harris, and Josh Harris who are separated by the events and attempting to reunite. Gavin has visions providing glimpses of when and where Eve and Josh are. The sinkhole and the sudden appearance of Teratornis has attracted the attention of the United States Department of Homeland Security who are studying a similar event in the Mojave Desert. As the series progresses, the investigators realize that the sinkholes provide a temporary portal to the same location in 10,000 BC. Meanwhile, the survivors struggle to find a way back through the portal before it closes up.

Season two revealed that the sinkholes were caused by the Lazarus Project run by people from 2076 who are working to find a way to deal with their time period's depleted resources as well as researching how to master de-extinction. The Lazarus Project is headed up by Gavin's long-lost father James Mallet.

Cast and characters

Main

 Natalie Zea as Eve Harris, a helicopter mom and office manager who falls into the sinkhole
 Eoin Macken as Gavin Harris, the estranged husband of Eve and former military pilot who has visions of 10,000 BC. 
 Diesel La Torraca portrays Isaiah, a young boy in the past who grows up to become Gavin Harris upon being sent through time
 Chiké Okonkwo as Ty Coleman, a therapist with a medical condition who Eve befriends
 Karina Logue as Marybeth Hill (season 1), a police officer from Baton Rouge, Louisiana, who was in Los Angeles while on the trail of her estranged son Lucas. She is later badly injured by one of Silas' followers and dies in Lucas' arms.
 Zyra Gorecki as Izzy Harris, Eve and Gavin's teenage daughter who lost her left leg in a car crash when being driven home by a neighbor
 Jack Martin as Josh Harris, Eve and Gavin's teenage son who falls into the sinkhole
 Veronica St. Clair as Riley Velez, Dr. Sam Velez's daughter whom Josh befriends
 Rohan Mirchandaney as Scott Israni, an anthropology graduate student from Australia who was working at the George C. Page Museum and is a recreational drug user who is always high.
 Lily Santiago as Veronica Castillo, an apparently religious young woman and former runaway who was badly affected when her apparent father Aaron was fatally mauled by a dire wolf
 Chloe De Los Santos as Lilly Castillo (season 1), a girl who is pretending that she cannot speak and passed off as Veronica's sister when she was really kidnapped by Veronica and Aaron. 
 Michelle Vergara Moore as Ella Jones (season 2; recurring season 1), a grown up version of Lilly that followed Isaiah to the present and has grown up to become an artist. She later sacrifices her life to let Veronica have the epipen when both of them are stung by poisonous yellowjackets.
 Jon Seda as Dr. Sam Velez, Riley's father, physician, and former SEAL
 Josh McKenzie as Lucas Hayes, Marybeth's estranged son who is a heroin trafficker and has a poor relationship with his mom ever since she shot his dad due to him planning to betray him to the police
 Nicholas Gonzalez as Levi Delgado, a United States Air Force pilot and an old friend of the Harris family
 Tonantzin Carmelo as Paara (season 2; recurring season 1), a Tongva Native American who speaks perfect modern English and lives in the Fort

Recurring

 Ione Skye as Jessica Harris (season 1), Gavin's adoptive sister and the aunt of Izzy and Josh
 Virginie Laverdure as Dr. Sophia Nathan (season 1), a United States Department of Defense operative who is investigating the sinkhole
 Toby Truslove as Senior Agent Adam Markman, a United States Department of Defense operative and Dr. Nathan's co-worker who is investigating the sinkhole
 Pacharo Mzembe as Tony Greene (season 1), a man who fell down a sinkhole. While in 10,000 BC, he repairs a Jeep.
 Stephen Lopez as Billy Fisher (season 1), Tony's husband who fell down the sinkhole and lost his glasses
 Damien Fotiou as Judah
 Ming-Zhu Hii as Dr. Rebecca Aldridge (seasons 1–2), a government scientist who knows more about time portals and sinkholes than she lets on and who appears to guide and/or influence the actions and decisions made by the other characters
 Mark Lee as Silas, an old man residing in the fort in 10,000 BC and has been introduced as Isaiah's grandfather and Caroline's father making him the great-grandfather of Izzy and Josh
 Martin Sensmeier as Taamet (season 2), the leader of the Exiles who also speaks the Tongva language due to him being the ex-husband of Paara. Before dying from the dagger wound caused by Scott, Taamet tells Gavin and Sam that Kiera hired him to raid the clearing for the book that Aaron was revealed to have in his possession.
 Jonno Roberts as James Mallet (season 2), the Director of the Lazarus Project from 2076 who is Gavin's long-lost father and Izzy and Josh's grandfather. Before dying from his gunshot wound during a strugggle with Gavin, James advises Gavin to tell his sister, who will come for him, that their father has failed.
 Melissa Neal as Caroline Clark (season 2), a scientist from 2076 who is Silas' daughter, Isaiah/Gavin's mother, and Josh and Izzy's grandmother. Caroline is a former leader of the Lazarus Project who went back/forward in time to 1988 to find the cause of and to stop the creation of the destructive temporal sinkholes that are created as an unwanted side-effect through the usage of the Lazarus Project temporal portal in 10,000 BC. She is later killed by Kiera.
 Simone McAullay as Kiera, a member of the Lazarus Project and James' personal assistant with an agenda of her own

Episodes

Series overview

Season 1 (2021)

Season 2 (2022–23)

Production

Development
On January 15, 2020, La Brea was given a pilot order by NBC. The pilot was directed by Thor Freudenthal and written by David Appelbaum who was expected to executive produce alongside Avi Nir, Alon Shtruzman, Peter Traugott, Ken Woodruff and Rachel Kaplan. The production companies involved with the series are Keshet Studios and Universal Television. On January 12, 2021, NBC gave production a series order. The series is created by Appelbaum. On November 12, 2021, NBC renewed the series for a 14-episode second season. On January 31, 2023, NBC renewed the series for a six-episode third season, when the cast was offered a release from the show in exchange for such a short season to be paid for, and accepted the offer. According to the extremely reliable Marc Berman of ProgrammingInsider, however, it is possible that the renewal decision was reversed.

Casting
In February 2020, Michael Raymond-James, Karina Logue, Zyra Gorecki, Caleb Ruminer, Angel Parker, Catherine Dent, Veronica St. Clair, Jag Bal, and Chiké Okonkwo were cast as series regulars while Natalie Zea was cast as the lead role. In March 2020, Jon Seda and Rita Angel Taylor joined the main cast. On March 4, 2021, Eoin Macken and Jack Martin were cast to replace Raymond-James and Ruminer, respectively and Lily Santiago joined the main cast. In addition, the surname of the family has been changed to Harris. On March 22, 2021, Nicholas Gonzalez and Rohan Mirchandaney joined the cast as series regulars. In April 2021, Josh McKenzie was cast as a series regular while Ione Skye was cast in a recurring role and Chloe De Los Santos was cast to replace Taylor. On May 12, 2022, Tonantzin Carmelo and Michelle Vergara Moore were promoted to series regulars for the second season. On July 15, 2022, Jonno Roberts joined the cast in a recurring role for the second season. On September 22, 2022, Martin Sensmeier was cast in a recurring capacity for the second season.

Filming
The series began filming in Melbourne, Australia, on May 3, 2021, and wrapped up in September 2021. The main photography of the series was shot in regional Victoria. The recordings for the first season were completed in September. The effects-heavy production spent $71 million in Australia, more than $60 million of it in Victoria. It is the most expensive TV production in Victoria since Steven Spielberg's HBO series The Pacific completed in 2009. The second season was scheduled to film in Victoria, Australia in the spring of 2022.

Release
In the USA, the series premiered on September 28, 2021 on NBC. The second season premiered on September 27, 2022 on NBC. In Canada, the series aired on CTV. In Australia, it will also air on 9Now. In Germany, La Brea premiered on Sky One on April 24, 2022. In Italy - La Brea premiered on Italia 1 on June 8, 2022. In the UK, the first episode of La Brea aired on Channel 5 on August 1, 2022 to promote the series, with the entire first series being added to Paramount+ on the same day. In Ireland, the first series was added in full to Paramount+ on August 1, 2022.

Reception

Critical response

The review aggregator website Rotten Tomatoes reported a 29% approval rating with an average rating of 4.5/10, based on 21 critic reviews. The website's critics consensus reads, "There may be method to its madness, but La Brea simply doesn't commit to its insane premise hard enough to shake out a show worth watching—at least not yet." Metacritic, which uses a weighted average, assigned a score of 49 out of 100 based on 7 critics, indicating "mixed or average reviews". In reviewing the series pilot, the television critic for The Globe and Mail wrote "The series is so wretchedly bad, it is gripping in its awfulness" while the reviewer for SCIFI.radio wrote that "La Brea is everything I hate in network television science fiction" and mentions the many scientific improbabilities in the first episode such as the "statistically unlikely number of survivors" from falling after exiting a time portal suspended hundreds of feet in the primeval sky that should have killed everyone. In contrast, the reviewer for The Guardian liked the series for being "gloriously, brazenly bad" while giving the series one out of five stars when the series debut in 2022 in the UK.

Ratings

Season 1

Season 2

Accolades 
The series was one of 94 out of the 200 most-popular scripted television series that received the ReFrame Stamp for the years 2021 to 2022. The stamp is awarded by the gender equity coalition ReFrame and industry database IMDbPro for film and television projects that are proven to have gender-balanced hiring, with stamps being awarded to projects that hire female-identifying people, especially women of color, in four out of eight key roles for their production.

See also
 Terra Nova, a Steven Spielberg-produced TV series about a 22nd-century family migrating from a dystopian America via a time portal to a colony set in the wilderness of the Cretaceous period.
 Time Spike, an Eric Flint novel about a 21st-century maximum security prison transported back in time to a Cretaceous period Earth via an exchange of an equivalent mass of Cretaceous land. This novel includes a subplot in which the U.S. government was using FEMA to hide the incident from the American public by claiming that Middle Eastern terrorists blew up the prison in such a way to make the area unsafe for entry by ordinary citizens.
 Land of the Lost, the 1970s children's show of a family in a pocket universe trying to find a way back to their own.
 A Sound of Thunder, a film based on the 1952 short story of the same name by Ray Bradbury, about "time tourists" who accidentally interfere too much with the past, completely altering the present.  Time travel has become a practical reality, and the company Time Safari, Inc. offers wealthy adventurers the chance to travel back in time to hunt extinct species such as dinosaurs.

References

External links
 

2021 American television series debuts
2020s American drama television series
2020s American mystery television series
2020s American science fiction television series
American thriller television series
American time travel television series
English-language television shows
Disaster television series
NBC original programming
Prehistoric life in popular culture
Sinkholes
Television series by Matchbox Pictures
Television series by Universal Television
Television series about families
Television shows set in Los Angeles
 Television shows set in California
Television shows filmed in Australia
Works about natural disasters
Television series about being lost from home